AMIX may mean:

 Amiga Unix, a computer operating system.
 The American Information Exchange, an early online information marketplace.